Tseng Jing-hua (born 30 December 1997) is a Taiwanese actor from Yilan. He is best known for playing the character of Birdy in the 2020 film Your Name Engraved Herein, the highest-grossing LGBT film in Taiwan. He also appeared as Wei Chung-ting in the supernatural horror Detention, for which he received a nomination for Best New Performer at the 56th Golden Horse Awards.

Filmography

Film

Television series

Short film

Music video appearances
2020: Crowd Lu - "Your Name Engraved Herein"
2020: Yo Lee - "One Who Will (Find Me)"
2022: A-Lin - "Best Friend" MV on YouTube

Awards and nominations

References

External links 

1997 births
Living people
21st-century Taiwanese male actors
Taiwanese male television actors
Taiwanese male film actors